William McGuckin (also Mac Guckin and MacGuckin), known as Baron de Slane (Belfast, Ireland, 12 August 1801 - Paris, France, 4 August 1878) was an Irish orientalist. He became a French national on 31 December 1838. and held the post of the Principal Interpreter of Arabic of the French Army from 1 September 1846 until his retirement on 28 March 1872. He is known for publishing and translating a number of important medieval Arabic texts.

Biography
De Slane was born in Belfast, the son of James McGuckin and Euphemia Hughes. After graduating from Trinity College Dublin, in 1822  he moved to Paris and studied oriental languages under Silvestre de Sacy.

In 1828 he was admitted to the Société Asiatique, a French learned society. The society financed Joseph Toussaint Reinaud and de Slane to prepare a critical edition of Abu'l-Fida (أبو الفداء)'s Arabic geography, Taqwīm al-Buldān (تقويم البلدان) - "Locating the Lands" (1321). This was published in 1840.

Between 1843 and 1846 he was sent on a mission by the French Government to catalogue important documents in the libraries of Algiers and Constantine. During this time he also served as an Interpreter of Arabic in the French African Army and in 1846 he was appointed as Principal Interpreter for the French African army. He served as Professor of Arabic at the École de langues orientales in Paris and from 1849 also taught Turkish. He was also commissioned by the Bibliothèque Nationale to catalogue their Arabic manuscripts.

On 30 October 1826 he married Angadrème Sophie Félicité de la Barre de Mérona. She died seven years later on 24 September 1833. He then married Anne Elise Sutton de Clonard and together they had five children. De Slane was awarded French citizenship on 31 December 1838. He died aged 76 in Passy, France on the 4 August 1878.

In France he was awarded following honours:

 Chevalier of the Legion of Honour, 24 September 1846
 Officer of the Legion of Honour, 26 December 1852
 Officer of the Instruction Publique
 Officer of the Order of Saints Maurice and Lazarus, awarded by King of Sardinia 
 Elected Member, 1862, of the Institut de France
 Founding Member of the Association Historique Algérienne

Selected publications
 
Arabic text of Abu'l-Fida's Takwin al-Buldan, one volume, 1840

Translation of a section of Ibn Battuta's rihla, 1843

Translation of Ibn Khallikan's biographical dictionary, four volumes, 1843-1871
 
 
 
 

Arabic text of Ibn Khaldun's Histoire des Berbères, 2 volumes, 1847-1851

Translation of Ibn Khaldun's Histoire des Berbères, 4 volumes, 1852-1856

 
 

Translation of Al-Bakri, 1859, one volume
 Revised edition with corrections (1913), Tangiers: Adolphe Jourdan.

Translation of Ibn Khaldun's Muqaddimah (Prolegomena), three volumes, 1863-1868

References

External links

Irish orientalists
Irish Arabists
French Arabists
French philologists
Members of the Société Asiatique
Members of the Académie des Inscriptions et Belles-Lettres
French translators
Arabic–French translators
Officiers of the Légion d'honneur
Recipients of the Ordre des Palmes Académiques
Officers of the Order of Saints Maurice and Lazarus
Writers from Belfast
1801 births
1878 deaths